The dorsal scapular vein is a vein which accompanies the dorsal scapular artery. It usually drains to the subclavian vein, but can also drain to the external jugular vein.

References

Veins of the torso